Kochanów may refer to the following places in Poland:
Kochanów, Lower Silesian Voivodeship (south-west Poland)
Kochanów, Skierniewice County in Łódź Voivodeship (central Poland)
Kochanów, Tomaszów Mazowiecki County in Łódź Voivodeship (central Poland)
Kochanów, Lublin Voivodeship (east Poland)
Kochanów, Lesser Poland Voivodeship (south Poland)
Kochanów, Lipsko County in Masovian Voivodeship (east-central Poland)
Kochanów, Przysucha County in Masovian Voivodeship (east-central Poland)